Camp X-Ray was a temporary detention facility at the Guantanamo Bay detention camp of Joint Task Force 160 on board the United States Naval Station Guantanamo Bay.
The first twenty detainees arrived at Guantanamo on 11 January 2002.
It was named Camp X-Ray because various temporary camps used to house Cuban and Haitian migrants in the 80s and 90s on board the station were named using NATO phonetic alphabet. The legal status of detainees at the camp, as well as government processes for trying their cases, has been a significant source of controversy; several landmark cases have been determined by the United States Supreme Court.

As of 29 April 2002, Camp X-Ray was closed and all prisoners were transferred to Camp Delta.

Background

Camp X-Ray was originally built during Operation Sea Signal to house "excludables" in the mid-1990s when Fidel Castro allowed any Cuban wishing to do so, to cross through the Cuban-operated minefields and enter the base. Excludables were held in Camp X-ray near Post 37 before being sent back to Cuba. Excludables included troublemakers from the regular camps, where the United States was processing Cuban Asylum Seekers (CAS) for emigration to the United States. The US government was at the time allowed access to Cuban records to process these people. Over 100,000 CAS were processed in the mid-1990s and allowed to enter the United States.During the War on terror, beginning in the fall of 2001 after the 9/11 attacks, the US reestablished the camp for housing captured combatants.  To get the camp up and operational Naval Mobile Construction Battalion 133 sent a detachment that had been working at Roosevelt Roads Naval Station.  The supervision and care of these detainees at Camp X-Ray was handled by Joint Task Force 160 (JTF-160), while interrogations were conducted by Joint Task Force 170 (JTF-170). JTF-160 was under the command of Marine Brigadier General Michael R. Lehnert until March 2002, when he was replaced by Brigadier General Rick Baccus. Since Camp X-Ray's closure and the subsequent opening of Camp Delta, JTF-160 and 170 have been combined into Joint Task Force Guantanamo (JTF-GTMO).

In accordance with U.S. military and Geneva Convention doctrine on prisoner treatment, soldiers guarding the detainees were housed in tents with living conditions "not markedly different" from that of the prisoners while the permanent facilities at Camp Delta were under construction. This camp was one of several locations managed by the United States where prisoners had suffered torture by US soldiers and agents in relation to interrogation.

Dick Cheney, as the then Vice President in 2002, said:

Prisoners could be detained until the end of the natural conflict in Iraq and Afghanistan.

Forensic examination

According to Carol Rosenberg, writing for the Miami Herald, Camp X-Ray was visited by a court-ordered forensic FBI team in November 2009. The team spent a week photographing the camp and searching for evidence of abuse of prisoners.

Brandon Neely
Camp X-Ray guard Brandon Neely later admitted throwing prisoners to the ground. In 2009, he tracked two inmates down and apologized for his treatment of them, saying that he still felt guilty. Neely also became involved with the organization Iraq Veterans Against the War.

See also
This Is Camp X-Ray, a UK art installation based on Camp X-Ray.
Camp X-Ray, an American independent drama film based on Camp X-Ray.

References

Prisons in Guantanamo Bay